Maksym Shemberev (born 25 September 1993) is a Ukrainian (until 2015) and Azerbaijani (since 2015) swimmer.

Career
Maksym Shemberev was born and raised in Ukraine. He competes in the Men's individual medley and represented Ukraine until 2015. Shemberev represented Ukraine at 2012 Summer Olympics in London. He finished 15th overall in the Men's 400 metre individual medley heats and failed to reach the final .

In 2015, Shemberev switched to represent Azerbaijan. During the 2017 Islamic Solidarity Games in Baku, Shemberev won four gold medals in Men's 200 meter butterfly, 400 meter individual medley, 800 meter freestyle and 1500 meter freestyle categories.

References

1993 births
Living people
Azerbaijani male swimmers
Islamic Solidarity Games competitors for Azerbaijan
Islamic Solidarity Games medalists in swimming
Male medley swimmers
Naturalized citizens of Azerbaijan
Olympic swimmers of Azerbaijan
Olympic swimmers of Ukraine
Sportspeople from Kyiv
Swimmers at the 2012 Summer Olympics
Swimmers at the 2020 Summer Olympics
Ukrainian emigrants to Azerbaijan
Ukrainian male swimmers